Camberley is a suburb of Hastings City, in the Hawke's Bay Region of New Zealand's North Island.

The fertile lands were added to the Hastings city boundary in 1957 to address a shortage of land.

Demographics

Camberley had a population of 2,196 at the 2018 New Zealand census, an increase of 279 people (14.6%) since the 2013 census, and an increase of 141 people (6.9%) since the 2006 census. There were 660 households, comprising 1,065 males and 1,134 females, giving a sex ratio of 0.94 males per female. The median age was 29.7 years (compared with 37.4 years nationally), with 591 people (26.9%) aged under 15 years, 519 (23.6%) aged 15 to 29, 822 (37.4%) aged 30 to 64, and 264 (12.0%) aged 65 or older.

Ethnicities were 40.7% European/Pākehā, 52.7% Māori, 20.8% Pacific peoples, 4.9% Asian, and 0.8% other ethnicities. People may identify with more than one ethnicity.

The percentage of people born overseas was 13.1, compared with 27.1% nationally.

Although some people chose not to answer the census's question about religious affiliation, 40.3% had no religion, 41.1% were Christian, 6.8% had Māori religious beliefs, 1.0% were Hindu, 0.4% were Muslim, 0.3% were Buddhist and 4.1% had other religions.

Of those at least 15 years old, 93 (5.8%) people had a bachelor's or higher degree, and 447 (27.9%) people had no formal qualifications. The median income was $21,300, compared with $31,800 nationally. 45 people (2.8%) earned over $70,000 compared to 17.2% nationally. The employment status of those at least 15 was that 723 (45.0%) people were employed full-time, 177 (11.0%) were part-time, and 84 (5.2%) were unemployed.

Education

Both schools are co-educational. Rolls are as of

References

Suburbs of Hastings, New Zealand